Piazzi is an impact crater that is located near the southwestern limb of the Moon, and is attached to the southeastern rim of the walled plain Lagrange. About three crater diameters to the south is the crater Inghirami. Piazzi is seen at an oblique angle from the Earth, and it appears oblong due to foreshortening.

As with Lagrange, this formation has been heavily modified by the ejecta from the formation of the Mare Orientale impact basin to the northwest. This material has formed radial valleys and ridges across the surface of these craters. The interior floor of Piazzi has dark patches of low albedo along the northeastern rim. The outer rim of the crater is irregular and eroded, and a few small craters lie within the uneven interior.

Satellite craters 

By convention these features are identified on lunar maps by placing the letter on the side of the crater midpoint that is closest to Piazzi.

See also 
 1000 Piazzia, asteroid

References

 
 
 
 
 
 
 
 
 
 
 
 

Impact craters on the Moon